Clarence Orohrelle Dodd (February 5, 1899 – December 25, 1955), often known as Clarence Orvil Dodd and C. O. Dodd, was an American author and magazine editor and an elder of a particular Church of God (Seventh Day) denomination church in Salem, West Virginia in the early 20th century.

In 1920 he married Martha I. Richmond, whom he predeceased. They had five children, four boys (Clebert, Robert, William, and Paul) and one daughter Mary, now Mary Dodd Ling.

He worked as a clerk for 35 years for Hope Natural Gas Company (now absorbed into ExxonMobil) while writing, editing and publishing his magazine, and serving his church, until he retired early due to Hodgkins' disease. Two years subsequent to his retirement he died.

Influence
In 1937 Dodd founded The Faith magazine, where he served as editor for many years.  Initially the primary focus of The Faith was advocating for observation of Jewish holy festivals on the part of its Christian readers but in the early 1940s Dodd took up the sacred name cause as well. In The Encyclopedia of American Religions scholar of American religions J. Gordon Melton wrote of the magazine, "No single force in spreading the Sacred Name movement was as important as The Faith magazine."

Andrew N. Dugger (November 19, 1886 – November 2, 1975), fellow church Elder of Dodd's and one-time editor of the long-running Adventist magazine Bible Advocate, co-authored a book with Dodd valued in many parts of the Adventist community, A History of the True Church. Having worked so closely together over so many years they undoubtedly influenced one another.  Melton says that Dugger accepted the same basic theology as Dodd.  One writer considers Dugger to be the most famous Church of God (Adventist) leader in the 20th century.

Mildred Kelvig, a lifelong acquaintance who had served for many years as his personal secretary, claimed that Dodd's acquaintance with Worldwide Church of God founder Herbert W. Armstrong influenced the latter's views.  She specified that Dodd convinced Armstrong of Greenberry G. Rupert's (May 12, 1848 – July 17, 1922, author of The Yellow Peril) assertions that observing Hebrew holidays is mandatory for a Christian.

Works

References

Adventism
American magazine editors
American religious writers
Businesspeople from West Virginia
People from Salem, West Virginia
Sacred Name Movement
Writers from West Virginia
1899 births
1955 deaths